Edward Turnour, 6th Earl Winterton, PC (4 April 1883 – 26 August 1962), styled Viscount Turnour until 1907, was an Irish peer and British politician who served as a Member of Parliament for 47 years, attaining the rare distinction of serving as both Baby of the House and Father of the House at the opposite ends of his career in the House of Commons.

Background
Turnour was the son of Edward Turnour, 5th Earl Winterton, and Lady Georgiana Susan Hamilton (1841–1913), daughter of James Hamilton, 1st Duke of Abercorn.

Turnour was educated at Eton College.

Political career
Turnour was first elected for Horsham in a by-election in 1904 at the age of just 21, the youngest Member of Parliament (MP) in the Commons, and remained an MP for the next 47 years. In 1907 he succeeded his father, becoming 6th Earl Winterton. This was an Irish peerage and did not disqualify him from remaining a member of the House of Commons. Sitting as a Conservative, Winterton slowly rose through the ranks, later achieving ministerial office as Under-Secretary of State for India in 1922, a post he held until 1924. In 1924 he was sworn of the Privy Council and once again served as Under-Secretary of State for India from 1924 to 1929.

Winterton did not hold office in the National Governments headed by firstly Ramsay MacDonald and then Stanley Baldwin. However, when Neville Chamberlain became Prime Minister in May 1937, Winterton was appointed Chancellor of the Duchy of Lancaster. In March 1938 he was promoted to the Cabinet and given the job of speaking in the House of Commons on behalf of the Secretary of State for Air Viscount Swinton, a member of the House of Lords. In this role he proved a noted failure, especially in a heated debate in May 1938 which led to Chamberlain concluding that the Secretary of State for Air must be an MP. In July 1938 he led the British delegation to the Evian Conference at which the problem of the Jewish refugees was debated. Thereafter, Winterton was increasingly sidelined. The following year he was dropped from the Cabinet and served in the marginal post of Paymaster-General before leaving the government altogether.

Winterton remained a Member of Parliament until 1951, by which time he was the MP with the longest continuous service. In 1952 he was created Baron Turnour, of Shillinglee in the County of Sussex, in the Peerage of the United Kingdom, which gave him a seat in the House of Lords.  The Patent creating this peerage is currently in the possession of Mark Lindley-Highfield of Ballumbie Castle.

Personal life
In September 1910 the mother of Ivy Gordon-Lennox acted to contradict a rumour that her daughter was engaged to marry Winterton, going so far as to place a notice in The New York Times to say that there was no engagement. Winterton married the Honourable Cecilia Monica Wilson, daughter of Charles Wilson, 2nd Baron Nunburnholme, in 1924. The marriage was childless. Winterton died in August 1962, aged 79, when the barony of Turnour became extinct. He was succeeded in his Irish titles by his kinsman, Ronald Chard Turnour, 7th Earl Winterton.

References

External links
 
 

1883 births
1962 deaths
Chancellors of the Duchy of Lancaster
Conservative Party (UK) MPs for English constituencies
Earls Winterton
Members of the Privy Council of the United Kingdom
Ministers in the Chamberlain peacetime government, 1937–1939
Ministers in the Chamberlain wartime government, 1939–1940
Barons created by George VI
People educated at Eton College
Turnour, Edward
UK MPs 1906–1910
UK MPs 1910
UK MPs 1910–1918
UK MPs 1918–1922
UK MPs 1922–1923
UK MPs 1923–1924
UK MPs 1924–1929
UK MPs 1929–1931
UK MPs 1931–1935
UK MPs 1935–1945
UK MPs 1945–1950
UK MPs 1950–1951
UK MPs who inherited peerages
UK MPs who were granted peerages
Deputy Lieutenants of Sussex